Śāntarasa (Sanskrit: , occasionally spelled shantarasa, santarasa) is considered as a ninth rasa, a concept of aesthetic flavour in Sanskrit literature. According to translation of Abhinavabhārati, Abhinavagupta's commentary on Nāṭyaśāstra by some experts,  may be defined as: "that which brings happiness and welfare to all beings and which is accompanied by the stabilization in the Self". It has as its stable emotion (sthāyibhāva) as impassivity which culminates in detachment (Vairāgya) arising from knowledge of truth and purity of mind. It was not included in the list of rasas mentioned by Bharata in his epic Nāṭyaśāstra. The inclusion of this rasa as a prominent one in Sanskrit poetry and dramaturgy is attributed to Udbhata, a president in the court of king Jayapida of Kashmir during 779-813 AD and a contemporary of Vamana. Much of the literary criticism on this flavor was further carried out by Ānandavardhana in his commentary on Mahābhārata and Rāmāyaṇa and later by Abhinavagupta in Nāṭyaśāstra.

Etymology
The term rasa, first appears in the epic text of Bharata, the antiquity of Nāṭyaśāstra which varies from 500 BC to 500 AD. Bharata's Nāṭyaśāstra discusses only about eight rasas. Post Bharata, many poets spoke only of the same eight rasas. Though some experts hint at many earlier poets before Bharata who accepted  as a ninth rasa. He also speculates the authorship of the ninth rasa as the main theme in dramatics and poetry to some Buddhist or Jain poets and dramatists for making this a leading rasa.

Overview

Ānandavardhana defines  as a flavor by portraying the attainment of happiness through disconnection with all the worldly desires. Whereas, a later Sanskrit connoisseur Abhinavagupta links it to the means of achieving mokṣa achieved resulting from the knowledge of the truth. Abhinavagupta, in accordance with the poets earlier to him, considers aesthetic pleasure to be a primary aspect in drama and poetry. He considers  as inherent flavor to attain spiritual liberation through tranquility. Hence, he places the ninth rasa as a supreme among others as it is a means to attain . Similarly, some commentators argue that the emotion of detachment from all the associated sentiments and passions from the worldly desires as a stable emotion of this rasa, which ultimately leads to peace and tranquility.

Commentaries
He classifies the Mahābhārata in three categories namely: a prescriptive work Śāstra, a story akhyana, and poetry kāvya and As his interpretation of stable emotion of this rasa is pleasure derived from the cessation of all desires He draws attention to one among many of the climaxes of the epic Mahābhārata, where all the Vṛṣṇis and Pānḍavas meet their respective miserable ends. He similarly constructs the story of Rāmāyaṇa where Rāma is separated from Sītā, which, according to Ānandavardhana, climaxes in both the  portrays  as the dominant flavor of disenchantment with the world, ultimately leading to liberation from worldly pleasures, whereas other rasas are placed in a subordinate position. Gary Tubb, in his scholarly work, argues the stable emotion of "the pleasure derived from the cessation of desire" should not be viewed as an emotion experienced by the characters, but as the emotional state intended to be evoked in the readers themselves.

Based on the length and contents of the work, the author himself considers it to be art-literature. In an opening verse in his , he declares  as a dominant aesthetic objective of his work. Kalhaṇa borrows the stable emotion for his  from Anandavarma's commentary on Mahabharata: pleasure derived from the cessation of desires. Though most of the central characters in his work show no sign of such an emotion, but here Kalhaṇa implies that the emotion needs to be evoked in the readers rather than experienced by the characters as suggested by Gary Tubb. As Kalhaṇa is intending to write an authentic historical account of the Kashmiri kings, he cannot recast the emotional mood of his work. Hence, despite a strong tendency to avoid unpleasant emotional flavors, as supported by then prevailing literary theory and poetic practice.

Reception
The critics of  have objected to considering it as a ninth rasa. But, one of the main objections comes as the way of defining its  as detachment. Many commentators argue, portraying such a state of cessation or detachment from all the worldly desires is not possible on the stage, hence it could not be an aesthetic flavor in poetics and dramaturgy. According to Sheldon Pollock, a new category in aesthetic flavors was created even though most of the religious poetry was based on the passion and desire of God and not about dispassion. Further, he quotes Mammaṭa, where he observes: "When the desire is directed toward a deity, we have 'emotion' rather than rasa."

References

Bibliography
 
 
 

Concepts in aesthetics
Literary theory
Sanskrit literature